Albert Tucker may refer to:

Albert Tucker (politician) (1843–1902), member of the Victorian Legislative Assembly
Albert W. Tucker (1905–1995),  Canadian mathematician
Albert Tucker (artist) (1914–1999), Australian painter
Al Tucker (1943–2001), Albert Tucker, American basketball player